Phalonidia mendora is a species of moth of the family Tortricidae. It is found in Santiago Province, Chile.

References

Moths described in 1968
Phalonidia
Endemic fauna of Chile